Sets can be classified according to the properties they have.

Relative to set theory
 Empty set
 Finite set, Infinite set
 Countable set, Uncountable set
 Power set

Relative to a topology
 Closed set
 Open set
 Clopen set
 Fσ set
 Gδ set
 Compact set
 Relatively compact set
 Regular open set, regular closed set
 Connected set
 Perfect set
 Meagre set
 Nowhere dense set

Relative to a metric
 Bounded set
 Totally bounded set

Relative to measurability
 Borel set
 Baire set
 Measurable set, Non-measurable set
 Universally measurable set

Relative to a measure
 Negligible set
 Null set
 Haar null set

In a linear space
 Convex set
 Balanced set, Absolutely convex set

Relative to the real/complex numbers
 Fractal set

Ways of defining sets/Relation to descriptive set theory
 Recursive set
 Recursively enumerable set
 Arithmetical set
 Diophantine set
 Hyperarithmetical set
 Analytical set
 Analytic set, Coanalytic set
 Suslin set
 Projective set
 Inhabited set

More general objects still called sets
 Multiset
  icarus set

See also

 
 

Basic concepts in set theory
Sets
Set theory